Azerbaijan Gymnastics Federation Public Association is the overall governing body of the sports of gymnastics in Azerbaijan.

History 
“Azerbaijan Gymnastics Federation” Public Association was founded In 1994 after the Ministry of Justice of Azerbaijan issued State Registration Certificate of the Federation (AGF). AGF became an Affiliated Member Federation of the International Federation of Gymnastics (FIG) in 1994. AGF joined the European Union of Gymnastics (UEG) in 1996. Later, the Federation was restructured and the Founding Conference of AGF conducted on the 7th of October, First Lady of Azerbaijan Mehriban Aliyeva was elected as the President of the Federation in 2002.

AGF was selected as the “Federation of 2009” by the Ministry of Youth and Sport of Azerbaijan in December 2009.National Olympic Committee of Azerbaijan awarded the President of AGF – Mehriban Aliyeva with the nomination of "Best Sports Figure of 2014” in December 2014. In March 2015, AGF ranked in the 3rd place by FIG for its activities for the year of 2014. The President of AGF, Mehriban Aliyeva was awarded with “Heydar Aliyev” order, and Vice-President of AGF, Altay Hasanov was awarded with “Shohrat” order by the President of Azerbaijan in June 2015 for their activities during the European Games.

Gymnastics disciplines 
The gymnastics disciplines included in the activities of AGF are the following:

Olympic disciplines 
Rhythmic Gymnastics, Men’s Artistic Gymnastics, Women’s Artistic Gymnastics

Non-Olympic disciplines 
Acrobatic Gymnastics, Aerobic Gymnastics

Non-competitive discipline 
Gymnastics for All

Trampoline Gymnastics 
Only individual performance on Trampoline is recognized as Olympic discipline.

Events 
The Federation organized the first sporting championship in 5 disciplines of gymnastics (Men's and Women's Artistic Gymnastics, Trampoline Gymnastics, Acrobatic Gymnastics and Aerobic Gymnastics) - Joint Gymnastics Championships in Azerbaijan in August 2014. AGF organized Inter-regional Cup in the framework of Azerbaijan and Baku Rhythmic Gymnastics Championship in December 2014. AGF conducted several international championships, as FIG Artistic  Gymnastics World Challenge Cup AGF Trophy  in February 2016, FIG World Trampoline Gymnastics Cup AGF Trophy in March 2016, FIG Rhythmic Gymnastics World Cup AGF Trophy in July 2016, FIG Trampoline Gymnastics and Tumbling World Cup AGF Trophy in February 2017, FIG Artistic  Gymnastics World Cup AGF Trophy in March 2017, FIG Rhythmic Gymnastics World Cup series, AGF Trophy in April 2017.

Administration 
The President of AGF is Mehriban Aliyeva, and Vice-President is Altay Hasanov.

The supreme governing body of AGF is General Assembly. The Executive Committee supervises the Federation’s activities between the sessions of General Assembly and reports to GA. General Assembly elects the members of EC for 5 years period.

Executive of AGF is composed of:
 EC Chairman – the President of AGF
 EC Deputy Chairman – the Vice-President of AGF
 3 EC Members.

Representation at FIG and UEG 
Nihad Hagverdiyev, the International Relations Manager of AGF was elected a member of Disciplinary Commission of FIG at the Council Meeting of the FIG conducted in Orlando in May 2007, and at the Council Meeting held in Lillestrøm in May 2009.

Farid Gayibov, the former Secretary General of AGF, was elected as a member of the Council of FIG at the 77th Congress of FIG held in Helsinki in October 2008, and at the 79th FIG Congress in Cancun in October 2012. Mr. Gayibov was elected as the Vice-President of UEG at the 25th Congress of the organization held in Portorož in December 2013. Farid Gayibov was elected the President of UEG at the 27th UEG Congress held in Split on December 2, 2017.

Mehman Aliyev, International Relations Manager of AGF was elected a member of Disciplinary Commission of FIG at the Council Meeting of the FIG conducted in Liverpool In May 2013.

Venue 

National Gymnastics Arena designed by Broadway Malyan was constructed between August 2009 and February 2014 to host Rhythmic and Artistic Gymnastics competitions. The Arena was inaugurated on April 16, 2014 and the 30th European Rhythmic Gymnastics Championships was the first event conducted at the NGA in June 2014.

See also 
 Gymnastics in Azerbaijan
 National Gymnastics Arena

References 

Gymnastics in Azerbaijan
Gymnastics
National members of the European Gymnastics